Catedral may refer to:

 Catedral (Buenos Aires Underground), a station
 Catedral (district), a district of the San José canton, in the San José province of Costa Rica
 Cerro Catedral, a mountain and ski resort in Argentina
 Cerro Catedral (Uruguay), the highest peak in Uruguay

See also
  Cathedral (disambiguation)